95th Regiment or 95th Infantry Regiment may refer to:

Union Army (American Civil War)
 95th Illinois Volunteer Infantry Regiment
 95th Indiana Infantry Regiment
 95th New York Volunteer Infantry
 95th Ohio Infantry
 95th Pennsylvania Infantry

Other uses
 95th Regiment of Foot (disambiguation), several units of the British Army
 95th Russell's Infantry, a unit of the British Indian Army
 95th Coast Artillery (United States)

See also 
 95th Division (disambiguation)